Killers Three is an American crime drama film produced in 1968 by Dick Clark Productions and released by American International Pictures starring Robert Walker Jr., Diane Varsi and Dick Clark. Others in the cast include Norman Alden, Maureen Arthur, Merle Haggard and Bonnie Owens.

This western crime drama was written for the screen by Dick Clark and Michael Fisher. It was produced by Clark and directed by Bruce Kessler.

The soundtrack-album featured country singers Merle Haggard, Bonnie Owens, Kay Adams and Jack Clement. Haggard sings his own compositions including "Mama Tried".

Plot
Johnny Warder gets out of prison and returns to North Carolina to marry sweetheart Carol, with whom he has a five-year-old son. Johnny and Carol decide to rob a local bootlegger's safe during a town picnic. Their accomplice is Roger, a former Army buddy of Johnny's with knowledge of explosives.

They blow the safe to get at the $250,000 inside, but the job goes awry. During their escape, Johnny and Roger kill a law-enforcement official.

At a diner, a sheriff, Carol's brother Charlie, spots the fugitives. In deference to his sister, Charlie agrees to give them a 10-minute head start before he contacts his fellow lawmen. But when emerging from a restroom, Roger doesn't realize who Charlie is and shoots him dead.

The police eventually surround the gang at a sawmill. During a shootout, Roger is killed. Johnny and Carol drive off in a hail of bullets, and Carol is also killed. Johnny drives her body back to her mother and son.

Cast
 Robert Walker Jr. as Johnny Warder
 Diane Varsi as Carol
 Dick Clark as Roger
 Norman Alden as Guthrie
 Maureen Arthur as Elvira Sweeney
 Merle Haggard as Charlie
 Bonnie Owens as Singer

Production 

Much of the movie was filmed in Ramseur, North Carolina, with additional scenes shot in Coleridge.

References

External links
 

1968 films
1968 crime drama films
1960s crime thriller films
American crime drama films
American crime thriller films
American International Pictures films
Films scored by Jerry Styner
Films directed by Bruce Kessler
1960s English-language films
1960s American films